Tazeh Kand-e Bekrabad (also Romanized as Tāzeh Kand-e Bekrābād; also known as Taza-Kyand and Tāzeh Kand) is a village in Ozomdel-e Shomali Rural District, in the Central District of Varzaqan County, East Azerbaijan Province, Iran. At the 2006 census, its population was 124, in 26 families.

References 

Towns and villages in Varzaqan County